Hàm Yên is a rural district of Tuyên Quang province in the Northeast region of Vietnam. As of 2003 the district had a population of 104,648. The district covers an area of 898 km². The district capital lies at Tân Yên.

Administrative divisions
Thị trấn Tân Yên, xã Hùng Đức, xã Bằng Cốc, xã Thành Long, xã Thái Hòa, xã Đức Ninh, xã Thái Sơn, xã Bình Xa, xã Nhân Mục, xã Yên Phú, xã Tân Thành, xã Minh Hương, xã Phù Lưu, xã Minh Dân, xã Yên Lâm, xã Minh Khương, xã Bạch Xa, xã Yên Thuận.

References

Districts of Tuyên Quang province
Tuyên Quang province